Kashi Ananda Leuchs (born 30 June 1978) from Dunedin, New Zealand is a former world class cross country mountain biker who represented New Zealand in mountain biking at the 2000 Olympic Games in Sydney, the 2004 games in Athens and the 2008 Games in Beijing. He also competed in the 2002 and 2006 Commonwealth Games, both in mountain biking and road racing finishing fourth in the 2002 Mountain Bike Cross Country.

In July 2006, Leuchs won the fourth marathon event of the 2006 Mountain Bike World Cup, held at Val Thorens in France.

He currently owns and runs Black Seal Imports, a company importing and distributing Yeti Cycles, Urge Bike and Brake Authority Products in New Zealand.

References

External links
 
 
 

1978 births
Sportspeople from Dunedin
New Zealand male cyclists
Cyclists at the 2000 Summer Olympics
Cyclists at the 2004 Summer Olympics
Cyclists at the 2008 Summer Olympics
Olympic cyclists of New Zealand
Living people
New Zealand mountain bikers
People educated at Logan Park High School
Cyclists at the 2002 Commonwealth Games
Cyclists at the 2006 Commonwealth Games
Commonwealth Games competitors for New Zealand